Daphnella inangulata is a species of sea snail, a marine gastropod mollusk in the family Raphitomidae.

Description

Distribution
This marine species occurs in the China Seas.

References

External links
 Li B.-Q. [Baoquan & Li X.-Z. [Xinzheng] (2014) Report on the Raphitomidae Bellardi, 1875 (Mollusca: Gastropoda: Conoidea) from the China Seas. Journal of Natural History 48(17-18): 999-1025.]

inangulata
Gastropods described in 2014